Anti-Mormonism is discrimination, persecution, hostility or prejudice directed against the Latter Day Saint movement, particularly the Church of Jesus Christ of Latter-day Saints (LDS Church). The term is often used to describe people or literature that are critical of their adherents, institutions, or beliefs, or physical attacks against specific Saints or the Latter Day Saint movement as a whole.

Opposition to Mormonism began before the first Latter Day Saint church was established in 1830 and continues to the present day. The most vocal and strident opposition occurred during the 19th century, particularly the forceful expulsion from Missouri and Illinois in the 1830s and 1840s, during the Utah War of the 1850s, and in the second half of the century when the practice of polygamy in Utah Territory was widely considered by the U.S. Republican Party as one of the "twin relics of barbarism" along with slavery.

Modern-day opposition generally takes the form of websites, podcasts, videos or other media promoting negative or hateful views about Mormonism or protest at large Latter-day Saint gatherings such as the church's semiannual General Conference, outside of Latter-day Saint pageants, or at events surrounding the construction of new LDS temples. Opponents generally believe that the church's claims to divine origin  are false, that it is non-Christian, or that it is a religion based on fraud or deceit on the part of its past and present leaders.  The FBI began tracking anti-Mormon hate crimes in the United States in 2015 and have noted an increase in incidents over time.

Origin

The term, "anti-Mormon" first appears in the historical record in 1833 by the Louisville (Kentucky) Daily Herald in an article, "The Mormons and the Anti-Mormons" (the article was also the first known to label believers in the Book of Mormon as "Mormons"). In 1841, it was revealed that an Anti-Mormon Almanac would be published. On August 16 of that year, the Latter Day Saint Times and Seasons reported the Mormons' confidence that although the Anti-Mormon Almanac was designed by "Satan and his emissaries" to flood the world with "lies and evil reports", still "we are assured that in the providence of God they will ultimately tend to the glory of God—the spread of truth and the good of the church".

Mormonism had been criticized strongly by dozens of publications since its inception, most notably by Eber D. Howe's 1834 book Mormonism Unvailed. The Latter Day Saints initially labeled such publications "anti-Christian", but the publication of the Almanac and the subsequent formation of an "Anti-Mormon Party" in Illinois heralded a shift in terminology. "Anti-Mormon" became, on the lips of the church's critics, a proud and politically charged self-designation.

Today, the term is primarily used as a descriptor for persons and publications that are active in their opposition to the LDS Church, although its precise scope has been the subject of some debate. It is used by some to describe anything perceived as critical of the LDS Church.

Siding with the latter, less-inclusive understanding of the term, Latter-day Saint scholar William O. Nelson suggests in the Encyclopedia of Mormonism that the term includes "any hostile or polemic opposition to Mormonism or to the Latter-day Saints, such as maligning Joseph Smith, his successors, or the doctrines or practices of the Church. Though sometimes well intended, anti-Mormon publications have often taken the form of invective, falsehood, demeaning caricature, prejudice, and legal harassment, leading to both verbal and physical assault."

Reaction
Many of those who have been labeled "anti-Mormon" object to the designation, arguing that the term implies that disagreement or criticism of Mormonism stems from some inherent "anti-Mormon" prejudice, rather than being part of a legitimate factual or religious debate. Eric Johnson, for example, makes a distinction between "personal animosity and intellectual dialogue". Johnson insists that he is motivated by "love and compassion for Mormons", and that while he "[might] plead guilty to being against Mormonism", he finds the suggestion that he is anti-Mormon "both offensive and inaccurate".  Stephen Cannon elaborates,

It is also helpful to know that Mormons are a group of people united around a belief system. Therefore, to be "anti-Mormon" is to be against people. Christians who desire to communicate the Gospel of Jesus Christ to Mormons are never to come against people of any stripe. Yes, evangelical Christians do have strong disagreements with Mormonism, but the argument is with a belief system and not a people. The LDS people are no better or no worse than any other group of people. Any dispute is to be a disagreement with the "ism", not the "Mormon".

James White, meanwhile, rejects the term because of a lack of reciprocal terminology. He wrote to one LDS apologist, "If you will identify yourself as an anti-Baptist, I'll let you call me an anti-Mormon."

Even some members of the church who write negatively about it, especially those who call into question its divine nature, have had their writings labeled anti-Mormon. Ex-Mormons who write about the church are likewise frequently labeled anti-Mormon, even when their writings are not inflammatory in nature. The debate on who is "anti-Mormon" frequently arises in Mormon discussions of authors and sources.

Stephen Cannon has argued that use of the label is a "campaign by Latter-day Saints to disavow the facts presented by simply labeling the source as 'anti-Mormon'". Critics of the term also claim that the LDS Church frames the context of persecution in order to cultivate a persecution complex, or that Mormon authors promote the ideal of a promised heavenly reward for enduring persecution for one's beliefs.

Those individuals and groups who challenge Mormonism, particularly those who approach the challenge from an evangelical Christian perspective, would generally sustain that they do, in fact, have the best interest of the Mormon at heart; and for the most part can legitimately claim to understand what the church teaches, since many challengers of Mormonism come from an LDS background.  In addition, they often declare that highly charged words such as "hatred" and "bigotry" are employed to an excessive degree to describe any challenge to a truth claim, and often cite this reactionary response as part of a Mormon "persecution complex."

History

Mormonism, or the Latter Day Saint movement, arose in western New York, the area where its founder, Joseph Smith, was raised, during a period of religious revival in the early 19th century. Smith claimed to have several visions involving God, Jesus and angelic Native American prophets.  These claims were often not received well by those in the community, as evident in the following excerpt from Smith's account of LDS Church history:

... one of the Methodist preachers ... treated my communication ... with great contempt, saying it was all of the devil, that there were no such things as visions or revelations in these days; that all such things had ceased with the apostles, and that there would never be any more of them. I soon found, however, that my telling the story had excited a great deal of prejudice against me among professors of religion, and was the cause of great persecution, which continued to increase; and though I was an obscure boy, only between fourteen and fifteen years of age, and my circumstances in life such as to make a boy of no consequence in the world, yet men of high standing would take notice sufficient to excite the public mind against me, and create a bitter persecution; and this was common among all the sects—all united to persecute me.

While the claims of a divine call often received a cold shoulder, the eventual publication of the Book of Mormon, and the official organization of the Church of Christ in 1830 were met with increased opposition on various fronts.

In New York and Pennsylvania, anti-Mormonism dealt mainly with issues including whether or not Smith actually had the gold plates; whether those plates belonged to the people rather than Smith; whether or not Smith ever really had had visions (at least ones of theological import); Smith's treasure-digging episodes; and alleged occult practices by Smith.

In Ohio, anti-Mormons focused on the ill-fated banking efforts of the Kirtland Safety Society and other failed economic experiments including the United Order.

In Missouri, once the gathering place of the Latter Day Saints, Mormons tended to vote as a bloc, wielding "considerable political and economic influence," often unseating local political leadership and earning long-lasting enmity in the sometimes hard-drinking, hard-living frontier communities. These differences culminated in hostilities and the eventual issuing of an executive order (since called the Extermination Order) by Missouri governor Lilburn Boggs declaring "the Mormons must be treated as enemies, and must be exterminated or driven from the State." Three days later, a renegade militia unit attacked a Mormon settlement at Haun's Mill, resulting in the death of 18 Mormons and no militiamen.  The Extermination Order was not formally rescinded until 1976.

In Nauvoo, Illinois, persecutions were often based on the tendency of Mormons to "dominate community, economic, and political life wherever they resided." The city of Nauvoo had become the largest in Illinois, the city council was predominantly Mormon, and the Nauvoo Legion (the Mormon militia) had grown to a quarter of the size of the U.S. Army. Other issues of contention included polygamy, freedom of speech, anti-slavery views during Smith's presidential campaign, and the deification of man.  After the destruction of the press of the Nauvoo Expositor and institution of martial law, Joseph Smith was arrested on charges of treason against the state of Illinois and incarcerated in Carthage Jail where he was killed by a mob on June 27, 1844. The persecution in Illinois became so severe that most of the residents of Nauvoo fled across the Mississippi River in February 1846.

In 1847 Mormons established a community hundreds of miles away in the Salt Lake Valley in Utah. Beginning in 1849, every federally appointed official left Utah under duress.  In 1857 President Buchanan concluded that the Mormons in the territory were rebelling against the United States. In response, President Buchanan sent one-third of the United States army to Utah in 1857 in what is known as the Utah War.

Early publications

Much of this anti-Mormon sentiment was expressed in publications during the early part of LDS Church history. In his 2005 biography of Joseph Smith, Richard Lyman Bushman cites four 1838 pamphlets as anti-Mormon: Mormonism Exposed by Sunderland, Mormonism Exposed by Bacheler, Antidote to Mormonism by M'Chesney, and Exposure of Mormonism by Livesey.

The first was the work of Origen Bacheler, who had no direct contact with the body of Mormons, and contained the contents of a debate between the author and Parley Pratt, with Pratt's side omitted. Bushman describes the author's rhetoric as indistinguishable from that uttered by  "scores of other polemicists of his time," providing a glimpse into the kind of material considered anti-Mormon. The pamphlet described Joseph Smith as a "blockhead", a "juggling, money-digging, fortune-telling impostor" and, along with the Book of Mormon witnesses, as "perhaps the most infamous liars and impostors that ever breathed. ... By their deception and lies, they swindle them out of their property, disturb social order and the public peace, excite a spirit of ferocity and murder, and lead multitudes astray on the subject in which, of all others, they have the deepest interest." He voiced outrage at "the miscreants who are battening on the ignorance and credulity of those upon whom they can successfully play off this imposture." He described the Book of Mormon as, "the most gross, the most ridiculous, the most imbecile, the most contemptible concern, that was ever attempted to be palmed off upon society as a revelation." He believed the religion "can be viewed in no other light than that of monstrous public nuisances, that ought forthwith to be abated" and that the Mormons were "the most vile, the most impudent, the most impious, knot of charlatans and cheat with which any community was ever disgraced and cursed." Antidote to Mormonism describes Mormons as "miserable enemies of both God and man—engines of death and hell." He described combat with them as being "desperate, the battle is one of extermination." Bushman describes the characteristics of these anti-Mormon materials as sensationalizing actuality:

British author Arthur Conan Doyle's A Study in Scarlet (1887), the novel in which the famous fictional detective Sherlock Holmes made his first appearance, includes a very negative depiction of the early Mormon community in Utah after its migration westwards and the foundation of Salt Lake City. Mormons are presented as violent, rigidly intolerant and corrupt, systematically terrorizing both members of the church and non-Mormon neighbors as well as forcing polygamous marriage on Mormon girls against their will.

Later in his career, Conan Doyle apologized to the Mormons for his depiction of their religion. During a 1923 tour of the United States, Doyle was invited to speak at the LDS Church's Salt Lake Tabernacle; while some individual Mormons remained deeply upset over the negative depiction, in general the Mormons present received him warmly.

Forms
Vehement opposition to the LDS Church comes from individuals or groups associated with the Christian countercult movement, which is mostly an evangelical Christian phenomenon.  In the 21st century opposition to Mormonism has become frequent among Secular or New Atheist groups.

Religious anti-Mormonism

Among those with religious motives, Daniel C. Peterson has identified two major streams of modern anti-Mormon thought. The first is "traditional anti-Mormonism", typified by Rev. Wesley Walters, Jerald and Sandra Tanner, and (to a certain extent) self-proclaimed "Bible Answer Man" and "cult expert" Walter Martin. Anti-Mormons in this category, "anxious to be taken seriously by at least a portion of the scholarly community," generally try to explain Mormonism in naturalistic terms. They appeal to "Joseph Smith's environment and his (wicked or pathological) character, perhaps assisted by a co-conspirator or two", as a sufficient explanation for Mormon origins.

"New Age anti-Mormonism", according to Peterson, "is quite different. It admits the presence of supernatural events in the founding events of the Church of Jesus Christ of Latter-day Saints and is quite willing to acknowledge continuous supernatural influence in the life of the Church today." However, "unlike faithful Latter-day Saints, New Age anti-Mormons see the supernatural agents involved in the founding and progress of the Church as demonic, occultic, diabolical, luciferian."

This "New Age anti-Mormon" grouping includes Ed Decker, Loftes Tryk, James R. Spencer and many others. According to Introvigne, New Age anti-Mormonism emerged in the 1980s largely as a result of the rise of Third-wave Pentecostalism and its emphasis on spiritual warfare.

Traditional anti-Mormons, according to Peterson, are those who "are content to argue that Mormonism is untrue" and "incompatible with the Bible." While some may believe that Satan was indirectly involved in the founding of the LDS Church, they place little emphasis on his role. For them, naturalistic and historical explanations are always preferable to supernatural ones.

Among the most prominent of the traditional anti-Mormons are Jerald and Sandra Tanner. Both former members of the LDS Church, the Tanners converted to evangelical Protestantism and in 1964 founded the Modern Microfilm Company to "document problems with the claims of Mormonism and to compare LDS doctrines with Christianity." In 1983 they turned their company into a non-profit organization and renamed it the Utah Lighthouse Ministry. The Tanners' work has included "publishing [reprints of] many hard-to-find Mormon historical documents" and "[debating] virtually every significant topic in Mormonism". During their prolific career they have published more than two hundred items on a variety of social, doctrinal, and historical issues.  Despite the high caliber of some of their work, the Tanners have been criticized on a number of points: notably for the vitriolic tone of some of their more polemical pieces, their resistance to change, and their unauthorized publication of several copyrighted documents. In recent years, the apologists' wrath toward the Tanners has somewhat subsided. In their study of anti-Mormon "word games", for example, Daniel C. Peterson and Stephen D. Ricks have nothing negative to say about them. Instead, they enlist them as allies against New Age anti-Mormons like Ed Decker, whose fabrications the Tanners have denounced on more than one occasion.

Perhaps the most controversial of the traditional anti-Mormons, however, was Walter Martin. Martin saw Mormons as deceivers who "pose as Christians". He called them "anti-Christian" and "a cult infiltration" and said they secretly harbor a "deep contempt for Christians". He further accused them of being egomaniacs and "cultists". Martin left as his legacy the Christian Research Institute.

New Age anti-Mormons have generated considerably more controversy than the previous category. The most prominent of their number, Ed Decker, is the producer of The God Makers and The God Makers II, as well as being the author of the books by the same name. The God Makers has attracted criticism not only from Latter-day Saints, but from traditional anti-Mormons as well. The film is generally considered acerbic and misleading, and has even provoked bomb threats against LDS meetinghouses and death threats against members. In other publications Decker has asserted that the source of Mormonism is Satan and that the spires on the LDS temple "represent an upside down nail, pointing defiantly toward heaven—as if to impale the Lord Jesus anew when he comes in the clouds of glory!" Furthermore, Decker sees Mormonism as a Satanic political conspiracy with roots in Hinduism and Baal worship.

When Decker was denounced by Jerald and Sandra Tanner, he went so far as to accuse them of being in the pay of the LDS Church and even of being "demonized" themselves. Decker and his associates offered to exorcise the Tanners' demons, and expressed great sadness when they refused.

The Christian writer William Schnoebelen asserted that "the marks on the Mormon Temple garments 'are held together by a subtle occult web of sexual energy which is activated by pressure from the two highest grips in the LDS Temple endowment.'" Tom Kellie similarly insisted that "the wives of Mormon apostles were compelled to submit to a special sexual type of operation." Other New Age anti-Mormons have called Mormons "pagans" and Mormonism "a fountain of slime".

Protests

Protesters have been visible as "street preachers" at LDS General Conferences, outside of LDS pageants, and temples. At the recently constructed Sacramento temple, for example, protesters dispersed pamphlets to visitors who came to take a guided tour. They also held up signs directing people to websites critical of the LDS Church. Notably, protesters also made an appearance at the 2002 Winter Olympics in Salt Lake City. One group that actively organizes peaceful protests, a non-profit organization called Mormonism Research Ministry, insists that its activities are not "anti-Mormon".

Our goal at MRM is not to be antagonistic. In fact, whenever a representative of MRM speaks publicly on this subject, we often emphasize how Christians should reflect a Christ-like attitude when sharing their faith. We must be firm in our convictions but compassionate and patient as well. ... It is true that, just as some Mormons want nothing more than to ridicule and insult those with whom they disagree, some Christians have done the same. This is wrong and always will be wrong.

Some other individuals have been seen throwing copies of the Book of Mormon on the ground, stepping on them, and portray using temple garments, which LDS hold sacred, as toilet tissue, and other similarly offensive actions. However, nearly every evangelical ministry, including those that actively challenge truth claims of Mormonism, vehemently condemns this sort of offensive and belligerent behavior, and further object to being placed in the same category as those few who engage in such behavior.

As a result of organized protests at Mormon events, a number of Latter-day Saints, and even non-Mormons, have begun to counter-demonstrate at events (by singing hymns, for example).

Secular anti-Mormonism
Opposition to Mormonism has been more prominent in the 21st century from New Atheism perspectives.  Richard Dawkins, Bill Maher and John Dehlin are among those who more prominent individuals who have used media appearances or podcasts to oppose the Institutional LDS Church and its doctrines and policies.

Legal
In March 2014, a court case was brought against LDS Church president Thomas S. Monson in the United Kingdom. Monson was accused by disaffected member Tom Phillips of breaching the Fraud Act 2006. The summons alleged that two men were induced to pay tithes to the LDS Church by church teachings which are objectively untrue. The alleged untrue teachings were:

 Joseph Smith translated the Book of Mormon from ancient gold plates and it is historically accurate; and
 Native Americans are descended from Israelites who left Jerusalem in 600 BC.

The court case was tossed out before trial. The judges dismissed the case with stark language.

Violence

Tangible acts of violence against Latter-day Saints are considerably less common in the United States today than they were in the 19th century. The first significant violent persecution occurred in the early 1830s in Missouri. Mormons tended to vote as a bloc there, wielding "considerable political and economic influence," often unseating local political leadership and earning long-lasting enmity in the frontier communities. These differences culminated in the Missouri Mormon War and the eventual issuing of an executive order (since called the extermination order within the LDS community) by Missouri governor Lilburn Boggs, which declared that "the Mormons must be treated as enemies, and must be exterminated or driven from the State." Three days later, a renegade militia unit attacked a Mormon settlement at Haun's Mill, resulting in the death of 18 Mormons and no militiamen. The extermination order was not formally rescinded until 1976.

After the destruction of the press of the Nauvoo Expositor in Nauvoo, Illinois, Joseph Smith was arrested and incarcerated in Carthage Jail where he was killed by a mob on June 27, 1844. The persecution in Illinois became so severe that most of the residents of Nauvoo fled across the Mississippi River in February 1846.

Even after Mormons established a community hundreds of miles away in the Salt Lake Valley in 1847, anti-Mormon activists in Utah Territory convinced U.S. President James Buchanan that the Mormons in the territory were rebelling against the United States; critics pointed to plural marriage as a sign of the rebellion. In response, President Buchanan sent one-third of the American standing army in 1857 to Utah in what is known as the Utah War.

More recent persecution against Mormons in the U.S. has occasionally taken the shape of acts of vandalism against church property (see Protests against Proposition 8 supporters). At an LDS Church building in Orangevale, Sacramento County, vandals spray painted "No on 8" and "No on Prop 8" on the front sign and sidewalk. An affiliate group of the radical Trans/Queer organization Bash Back!, claims credit for pouring glue into the locks of an LDS Church building and spray painting on its walls. An internet posting signed by Bash Back!'s Olympia chapter said: "The Mormon church ... needs to be confronted, attacked, subverted and destroyed." According to the Chicago Tribune, the acts of vandalism against the LDS Church appear to be in retaliation for support of Proposition 8.  Police reported that nine church buildings were also damaged in Utah that month.  The Anti-Defamation League released a statement condemning the "defacement and destruction of property."

In November 2008, the United States Postal Service delivered envelopes containing white powder to two LDS Church temples—the Los Angeles California Temple and the Salt Lake Temple—and to the Knights of Columbus' national headquarters in New Haven, Connecticut, prompting a hazardous materials response and a federal domestic terrorism investigation. The LDS Church blamed opponents of the marriage ban for sending the hoax mailings, while a group that also supported the measure condemned "acts of domestic terrorism against our supporters." LGBT rights groups, such as Equality Utah and Equality California, have spoken out against the use of violence in protests, and note that the source of the "white powder" mailings has not been determined.

In Latin America, however, hatred of Mormons has often taken on a much deadlier form. In May 1989, members of a terrorist organization called the Zarate Willka Armed Forces of Liberation murdered two Mormon missionaries in La Paz, Bolivia. Another Bolivian terrorist group, the Tupac Katari Guerrilla Army, claimed responsibility for two attacks against Mormon chapels. The Lautaro Youth Movement in Chile conducted 27 small-scale bombings against LDS meetinghouses in 1992. The MIPT Terrorism Knowledge Base lists 149 individual attacks that have been carried out against Mormon targets in Latin America since 1983. It also lists a 2001 chapel-bombing in Croatia.

Responses

Official

Although a position on anti-Mormonism is not part of the official doctrine of the LDS Church, it has been mentioned specifically in a number of general conference talks made by church general authorities.

Marvin J. Ashton, speaking as a member of the Quorum of the Twelve Apostles, began a fall 1982 conference by relating an experience he had with a protester outside Temple Square. He went on to declare "[t]o the world, and especially to members of The Church of Jesus Christ of Latter-day Saints" that "there is no time for contention." He then quoted Robert Frost in his prescribed response to anti-Mormonism:
The poet Robert Frost once defined education as "the ability to listen to almost anything without losing your temper or your self-confidence." Probably we will never be free of those who are openly anti-Mormon. Therefore, we encourage all our members to refuse to become anti-anti-Mormon. In the wise words of old, can we "live and let live"?

Carlos E. Asay of the Presidency of the First Quorum of the Seventy spoke in the fall 1981 conference concerning opposition to the LDS Church. He describes "Lucifer" as the source of at least some anti-Mormon and apostate groups, relates an experience of a Mormon convert being excommunicated and encourages the avoidance of "those who would tear down your faith.”

Gordon B. Hinckley, the president of the LDS Church, related a story in the fall 1997 conference in which he read from the letter of an ex-Mormon who left the church at the urging of his fiancée, whom the letter-writer indicates is anti-Mormon. Hinckley describes the situation in the letter as a "terrible tragedy" and states that he "believe[s] the writer still has a testimony of this work. That testimony has been with him since the time he was baptized, but he has felt neglected and of no consequence to anyone."

A passage from an early Mormon epistle addresses a claimed tendency of ex-Mormons to criticize the church of which they are no longer a part:  
	
[A]postates after turning from the faith of Christ ... have sooner or later fallen into the snares of the wicked one, and have been left destitute of the Spirit of God, to manifest their wickedness in the eyes of multitudes. From apostates the faithful have received the severest persecutions ... "When once that light which was in them is taken from them, they become as much darkened as they were previously enlightened, and then, no marvel, if all their power should be enlisted against the truth," and they, Judas like, seek the destruction of those who were their greatest benefactors.

In 1985, Vaughn J. Featherstone, a member of the First Quorum of the Seventy of the LDS Church, addressed students at the church-owned Brigham Young University, calling anti-Mormon material "theological pornography that is damaging to the spirit," stating that "none of it is worth casting an eye upon. Do not read the anti-Mormon materials. That is not the way you resolve questions about the truthfulness of the restored gospel."

Apologetic

Mormon apologetics and members vary both in their perception of criticism and opposition, as well as what they see as falling under the umbrella of anti-Mormonism. Hugh Nibley, the author of voluminous works in response to books deemed anti-Mormon, including a chapter on how to write an anti-Mormon book, explained why he thinks ex-Mormons criticize the church:

Apostates usually become sometimes feverishly active, determined to prove to the world and themselves that it is a fraud after all. What is that to them? Apparently it is everything—it will not let them alone. At the other end of the scale are those who hold no rancor and even retain a sentimental affection for the Church—they just don't believe the gospel. I know quite a few of them. But how many of them can leave it alone? It haunts them all the days of their life. No one who has ever had a testimony ever forgets or denies that he once did have it—that it was something that really happened to him. Even for such people who do not have it anymore, a testimony cannot be reduced to an illusion.

Davis Bitton presented criteria on how to identify anti-Mormon material in a 2004 paper published for the Foundation for Ancient Research and Mormon Studies (FARMS) entitled, "Spotting an Anti-Mormon Book." He specifies inaccuracy, telling Mormons what they believe, strong preference for negative information, always showing "the church, its leaders, its people, and its beliefs in the worst possible light," participating in anti-Mormon activities, denouncing the church, engaging in "behavior defiantly contrary to church standards," unjustly claiming to be a Latter-day Saint, and indulging in "snide, disrespectful, cruel comments about the Saints and those they sustain as prophets" as characteristics of anti-Mormon books and authors. Additionally, he singles out publishers such as the Utah Gospel Mission and the Utah Lighthouse Ministry as being "anti-Mormon, at least in intent."

In another FARMS review, this time of New Approaches to the Book of Mormon: Explorations in Critical Methodology by Brent Lee Metcalfe, Bitton reveals more of his thoughts on the subject:

I am not entirely comfortable with labeling this an anti-Mormon work, for I don't see hatred of the Church and a determination to destroy as the prime motive behind it. On the other hand, whatever the intention of individual authors, the label is not entirely misapplied either. In any case, one thing is sure: the compilation will be exploited by the Mormon-haters.

Others consider the definition of anti-Mormonism rather fundamentally: those in opposition to or against the LDS Church. While not including those who simply believe differently, it includes those who are actively engaged in opposing the LDS Church. Thus, a person's intelligence, honesty, qualification or accreditation do not make them anti-Mormon. Anti-Mormon arguments are those in opposition to the claims and institutional aims of the LDS Church, and anti-Mormons are those who spend a significant amount of time opposing the church via such arguments or otherwise.

Many members of the LDS Church believe that since the church is sanctioned by God, Satan and his followers will seek to destroy it, with some even seeing this opposition as evidence that the LDS Church has divine origins. Some avoid anti-Mormon material, while others analyze and criticize it, such as William J. Hamblin, who addresses anti-Mormon attacks on the geography and archeology of the Book of Mormon in "Basic Methodological Problems with the Anti-Mormon Approach to the Geography and Archaeology of the Book of Mormon."

Other prominent LDS Church members note that the opposition from anti-Mormonism can actually be beneficial. As Hugh Nibley expressed it, "We need more anti-Mormon books. They keep us on our toes." Michael R. Ash of the Foundation for Apologetic Information and Research (FAIR) dissected this viewpoint in "The Impact of Mormon Critics on LDS Scholarship", concluding that the accusations of critics are helpful in encouraging and stimulating further research. Orson Pratt also seemed to invite criticism when he said:

Convince us of our errors of doctrine, if we have any, by reason, by logical arguments, or by the word of God, and we will be ever grateful for the information, and you will ever have the pleasing reflection that you have been instruments in the hands of God of redeeming your fellow beings from the darkness which you may see enveloping their minds.

Evangelical

Regarding the subject of Christian anti-Mormonism, Richard Mouw (President of the Fuller Theological Seminary) stated in 2004 at the Salt Lake Tabernacle in Salt Lake City,

I am now convinced that we ... have often seriously misrepresented the beliefs and practices of the Mormon community. Indeed, let me state it bluntly to the LDS folks here this evening: we have sinned against you. The God of the Scriptures makes it clear that it is a terrible thing to bear false witness against our neighbors, and we have been guilty of that sort of transgression in things we have said about you. We have told you what you believe without making a sincere effort first of all to ask you what you believe...Indeed, we have even on occasion demonized you, weaving conspiracy theories about what the LDS community is 'really' trying to accomplish in the world.

Mouw is not the only Christian calling for moderation. Similar pleas have been issued by David Rowe, Carl Mosser, Francis J. Beckwith, Paul Owen, Craig Blomberg, and others. Some church and parachurch groups have also made efforts to repair relations with the Mormons. In the 1980s, Jerry Falwell's Moral Majority "took some small steps toward Evangelical-Mormon cooperation for a shared social, political, and ethical agenda". More recently, a Pentecostal congregation in Provo, Utah held a public ceremony of repentance for its negative attitudes and actions toward the Latter-day Saint community. In 2001, the organization Standing Together, based in Lehi, Utah, was founded by a Baptist minister for the purpose of "building bridges of relationship and dialogue with ... The Church of Jesus Christ of Latter-day Saints." Standing Together hosts public seminars in which Evangelical scholar Greg Johnson and LDS scholar Robert Millet "communicate how they have maintained their friendship and at the same time discussed candidly their theological differences and concerns for one another."  However, Standing Together is most recognized for their activities at General Conference, where they literally stand together, taking up space to deny its use by those who come to be disruptive influences.

Some traditional Christian churches and ministries, however, have expressed varying degrees of concern about the movement to abandon what they consider to be valid and cogent challenges to Mormon doctrine and teaching for the sake of "peaceful co-existence", and yet at the same time do not wish to be categorized with the fringe Christian elements that seek to be openly disruptive and antagonistic toward the LDS community.

Political
In 2011, Rick Santorum was asked if Jon Huntsman and Mitt Romney would have problems in the 2012 presidential election cycle as Mormons. Santorum answered, "I hope not. ... I hope that people will look at the qualities of candidates and look at what they believe and what they're for and look [at] their records and then make a decision."

Then-Vice President Joe Biden said, in a long response to a University of Pittsburgh student's question about how his own religious faith affected his philosophy of government:

I find it preposterous that in 2011 we're debating whether or not a man is qualified or worthy of your vote based on whether or not his religion ... is a disqualifying provision. ... It is not. It is embarrassing and we should be ashamed, anyone who thinks that way.

See also

 American Party (Utah)
 Anti-Christian sentiment
 Anti-Catholicism
 Anti-Protestantism
 Persecution of Eastern Orthodox Christians
 Persecution of Jehovah's Witnesses
 A Victim of the Mormons
 Criticism of LDS Church
 Ex-Mormon
 Freedom of religion in the United States
 Latter Day Saint martyrs
 Latter Day Saints in popular culture
 Mormonism and Christianity
 Phrenology and the Latter Day Saint Movement
 Portrayal of Mormons in comics

Notes

References

External links

 Basic Methodological Problems with the Anti-Mormon Approach to the Geography and Archaeology of the Book of Mormon published by the Foundation for Ancient Research and Mormon Studies (FARMS)
 Celsus and Modern Anti-Mormonism published on Foundation for Apologetic Information & Research
 Article on Anti-Mormon Publications published on LightPlanet.com
 Anti-Mormon – Evangelical Protestant view of how the term "anti-Mormon" is misused
 Old Themes and Stereotypes Never Die: The Unchanging Ways of Anti-Mormons published on Foundation for Apologetic Information & Research
 Tabernacle on Trial: Mormons Dismayed by Harsh Spotlight – The Wall Street Journal By Suzanne Sataline, February 8, 2008; Page A1
 Anti-Mormonism and the Question of Religious Authenticity in Antebellum America (PDF)
 Some Themes of Counter-Subversion: An Alalysis of Anti-Masonic, Anti-Catholic, and Anti-Mormon Literature
 

History of the Latter Day Saint movement
Criticism of Mormonism
Mormonism-related controversies
Mormon studies
Mormonism
Mormonism
Religious discrimination in the United States
Mormonism